Cerithiopsis vanhyningi is a species of sea snail, a gastropod in the family Cerithiopsidae, which is known from the Gulf of Mexico and the Caribbean Sea. It was described by Bartsch, in 1918.

Description 
The maximum recorded shell length is 3 mm.

Habitat 
Minimum recorded depth is 15 m. Maximum recorded depth is 15 m.

References

vanhyningi
Gastropods described in 1918